Jamey Bowen (born November 8, 1969 in Edmonton, Alberta) is a former lacrosse player who played for the Edmonton Rush in the National Lacrosse League. He also teaches at St. Francis Xavier Composite High School in Edmonton, Alberta.

Statistics

NLL

References

1969 births
Living people
Canadian lacrosse players
Edmonton Rush players
Sportspeople from Edmonton